This is a list of diplomatic missions of the Holy See. Since the fifth century, long before the founding of the Vatican City State in 1929, papal envoys (now known as nuncios) have represented the Holy See to foreign potentates. Additionally, papal representatives known not as nuncios but as apostolic delegates ensure contact between the Holy See and the Catholic Church in countries that do not have diplomatic relations with the Holy See.

At present, there is one residential apostolic delegate, for Jerusalem and Palestine, as well as non-residential delegates for four countries (Brunei, Laos, Mauritania, and Somalia) and for the territories and countries without diplomatic relations with the Holy See in three regions (the Arabian Peninsula, the Caribbean, the Pacific Ocean). For Vietnam, the 21st-century appointees of the Holy See have been given the title "pontifical representative". In keeping with the "one China" policy, no representative is appointed for mainland China, and the Holy See is represented in Taipei by an apostolic nunciature, headed not by a nuncio, but only by a chargé d'affaires.

In addition to the countries mentioned above that have apostolic delegations, the following nations do not have diplomatic relations with the Holy See: Afghanistan, Bhutan, North Korea, Saudi Arabia, and Tuvalu.

Description
In most respects the status of the diplomatic missions of the Holy See are identical with those of other countries, with the exception of the nomenclature: apostolic nuncios have ambassadorial rank and apostolic nunciatures are ranked as embassies. However, in most countries of central and western Europe and of central and southern America, as well as in a few countries elsewhere, the nuncio is granted precedence over other ambassadors and is dean of the diplomatic corps from the moment he presents his credentials. The Holy See, which does not issue visas, does not have consulates.

Apostolic delegates and their missions do not have diplomatic status as nuncios and nunciatures do.

In countries that allow it, the apostolic nunciature is sometimes, though rarely, located outside the capital, perhaps in towns with particularly important religious connections, such as the village of Rabat in Malta, the site of Saint Paul's grotto, and Harissa in Lebanon where Maronite, Greek Orthodox and Melkite Greek Catholic Church authorities are located. In other countries that is not permitted: when India opened diplomatic relations with the Holy See, the apostolic delegation moved from Bangalore to the capital, New Delhi; and in Australia the mission moved from Sydney to Canberra. In Israel, the nunciature is located in Tel Aviv.

Listed below are the Holy See's apostolic nunciatures, apostolic delegations, and observer or representative missions to international governmental organizations — such as the United Nations, the Council of Europe and the Arab League.

Africa

Americas

Asia

Europe

Oceania

 Canberra (Apostolic Nunciature)

 Wellington (Apostolic Nunciature)

 Port Moresby (Apostolic Nunciature)

Multilateral organisations
 United Nations, New York (Permanent Observer)
 United Nations, Geneva (Permanent Observer)
 Council of Europe, Strasbourg (Permanent Observer)
 Paris (Permanent Observer of the Holy See to UNESCO)
 Nairobi UN agencies: UNEP and UN-Habitat 
 Madrid to UNWTO 
 Rome to FAO and food programs
 Vienna (Perm Rep/Perm Obs to International orgs & U.N. in Vienna) 
 United Nations Industrial Development Organization (UNIDO)
 International Atomic Energy Agency (IAEA) 
 International Committee of Military Medicine (ICMM) 
 International Institute for the Unification of Private Law (UNIDROIT)  
 International Organization for Migration (IOM) 
 Organisation for the Prohibition of Chemical Weapons (OPCW) 
 Preparatory Commission for the Comprehensive Nuclear-Test-Ban Treaty Organization (CTBTO)

Regional
 Association of Southeast Asian Nations (ASEAN) 
 Economic Community of West African States (ECOWAS) 
 Organization for Security and Co-operation in Europe (OSCE)

Gallery

Nunciatures that have ceased to exist 
The following nunciatures are among those that have ceased to exist:
Apostolic Nunciature to Bavaria
Apostolic Nunciature to Cologne
Apostolic Nunciature to Czechoslovakia
Apostolic Nunciature to Florence
Apostolic Nunciature to Gratz
Apostolic Nunciature to the Emperor
Apostolic Nunciature to Naples
Apostolic Nunciature to Prussia
Apostolic Nunciature to Savoy
Apostolic Nunciature to Venice
Apostolic Nunciature to Yugoslavia

See also

 Apostolic Nunciature
 Foreign relations of the Holy See
 Holy See and the United Nations
 Index of Vatican City-related articles
 Legal status of the Holy See
 List of heads of the diplomatic missions of the Holy See

Notes

References

External links
 

 
Catholic ecclesiastical titles
Holy See
Diplomatic missions